Flashpoint is a 2011 comic book crossover story arc published by DC Comics. Consisting of an eponymous core limited series and a number of tie-in titles, the storyline premiered in May 2011. The core miniseries was written by Geoff Johns and pencilled by Andy Kubert. In its end, the series radically changes the status quo for the DC Universe, leading into the publisher's 2011 relaunch, The New 52.

Flashpoint details an altered DC Universe in which only Barry Allen seems to be aware of significant differences between the regular timeline and the altered one, including Cyborg's place as the world's quintessential hero, much like Superman is in the main timeline, with Superman himself being held captive as a lab-rat by the United States government within an underground facility in Metropolis. In addition, Thomas Wayne is Batman, and a war between Wonder Woman and Aquaman has decimated western Europe. 

Consisting of a 61 issue run, the series crossed over with Booster Gold, sixteen separate three-issue miniseries, and a number of one-shots beginning in June 2011. DC announced that Flash #12 would be the last in the series; a thirteenth issue had been announced for sale on May 25, 2011, but was withdrawn. 

A sequel series, Flashpoint Beyond, debuted in 2022, with Johns returning to write the series alongside Jeremy Adams and Tim Sheridan.

The storyline is adapted in the film Justice League: The Flashpoint Paradox as well as in the third season of The CW network television series The Flash. Elements of the Flashpoint storyline will be adapted into a feature film adaptation of The Flash as part of the DC Extended Universe.

Plot 

Barry Allen wakes up to discover everything and everyone around him has changed. He is not Flash, nor does he have powers. His mother Nora (deceased in his own timeline) is alive; his father, Henry, died of a heart attack three years ago (alive and in prison in his own timeline). Captain Cold is Central City's greatest hero, the Justice League was never established, and even Superman is seemingly nonexistent. In Gotham City, Batman throws a criminal off a building. Cyborg and Batman have a conference with a group of superheroes to discuss how Wonder Woman's Amazons have conquered the United Kingdom, while Aquaman's Atlanteans have sunk the rest of Western Europe, and the battle between the two has caused massive death and destruction. America is similarly endangered. The heroes cannot cooperate to find a solution, and the meeting is ended. Barry Allen drives to the Batcave, where Batman attacks him. Batman is revealed to be Thomas Wayne—in this timeline his son, Bruce, was killed by the robber instead of his wife and himself. In this timeline, Thomas brutally beat the robber to death for murdering Bruce, and Martha went insane at the loss of her son, becoming the Joker.

In the flooded remains of Paris, Deathstroke captains a pirate ship in search of his daughter. Emperor Aquaman appears and stabs Deathstroke in the chest and attacks Deathstroke's crew (Sonar, Icicle, and Clayface). Sonar is able to remove a piece of the trident from Deathstroke's chest and heal him. At Wayne Manor, Barry tries to explain to Thomas about his secret identity as the Flash and his relationship to Bruce Wayne. Barry's memory begins to spontaneously realign itself to the altered timeline and Barry realizes that the world of Flashpoint is not a parallel dimension, but an alternate reality. Barry's ring ejects Eobard Thawne's Reverse-Flash costume and causes Barry to believe that his enemy is responsible for changing history. Barry decides to recreate the accident that gave him his powers in a bid to undo the damage caused by Thawne, but his initial attempt fails and leaves him badly burned.

In London, Steve Trevor is waiting at a rendezvous for Lois Lane but is attacked by Wonder Woman and the Amazons. Wonder Woman catches him by the neck with her Lasso of Truth and begins interrogating him. He explains that he was hired to extract Lane from New Themyscira because she was sent to gather information on the Amazons for Cyborg. The U.S. president informs Cyborg that Steve Trevor sent a signal to the Resistance but was intercepted because of a traitor among the heroes that Cyborg tried to recruit. Cyborg is relieved of duty as Element Woman sneaks into the headquarters. Meanwhile, in New Themyscira, Lane encounters the Resistance. A second attempt at recreating Allen's accident restores his powers and health. He concludes that the Reverse-Flash changed history to prevent the formation of the Justice League. He also learns that Kal-El was taken by Project: Superman. Flash, Batman and Cyborg join the cause to stop Wonder Woman and Aquaman. The three find a pale, weakened Superman at the Project and realize that he may well have been in a containment cell since he was a child—possibly never even seeing a human being before. After being rescued, Superman flies off in seeming fright in the midst of a battle with the guards, leaving the three in the sewers to be rescued by Element Woman. Flash's memories continue to change.

The president announces Cyborg's failure to unite the world's superheroes and the U.S. enters into the Atlantean-Amazon war. Flash, Batman, Cyborg, and Element Woman ask for the Marvel Family's help and Batman asks Billy to use his lightning to prevent Flash's memories from changing even further. The group hears of the failed air assault on England due to the Amazons' Invisible Plane air force. Hal Jordan, who had not become Green Lantern in this timeline, is the first casualty, and a giant Atlantean-generated tidal wave threatens the rest of New Themyscira. Flash tells Batman that if he fails to stop Thawne, the world will destroy itself. Despite reservations, Batman joins Flash as the group heads off to New Themyscira. Enchantress joins them en route. Wonder Woman and Aquaman are fighting one-on-one until Flash and his team arrive. The Marvel Family transforms into Captain Thunder, also transforming Tawky Tawny. Captain Thunder attacks Wonder Woman and appears to be winning until Enchantress reveals herself as the Amazon spy in the Resistance and uses her magic to restore the Marvel Family to their mortal forms. Penthesilea (who was secretly one of the conspirators of the Atlanteans-Amazons war, along with Orm) kills Billy Batson, causing a massive explosion that cripples the opposing forces. In the wake of the devastation, Thawne appears in front of Flash.

The Reverse-Flash reveals that Flash himself created the Flashpoint timeline by traveling back in time to stop him from killing Barry's mother. Barry pulled the entire Speed Force into himself to stop Thawne, transforming the timeline by shattering the history of his allies. Thawne resets Barry's internal vibrations, enabling him to remember this. According to Thawne, these actions transformed him into a living paradox, no longer requiring Barry to exist and allowing him to kill the Flash without erasing his own existence. Thawne continues to taunt Barry with this knowledge until Batman kills him with an Amazonian sword. As the fight continues, Superman arrives and begins to aid the heroes, first by landing hard enough to crush the Enchantress under his feet. Thomas insists that Barry put history back to normal to undo the millions of deaths. Meanwhile, Cyborg detects seismic activity which he claims could destroy the world. Waves start to approach. Now knowing the point of divergence, the Flash restores the timeline. As he enters the timestream, a dying Thomas thanks him for giving his son a second chance and gives Barry a letter addressed to Bruce. Barry then meets with his mother and bids a tearful farewell to her.

Traveling back in time, Barry merges with his earlier self during the attempt to stop Thawne. While traveling through time, Barry realizes he can see three different timelines — DC (New Earth), Vertigo (Earth-13), and WildStorm (Earth-50). A mysterious hooded figure tells him that the world was split into three to weaken them for an impending threat, and must now be reunited to combat it. The DC, Vertigo, and Wildstorm universes are then merged, but unbeknownst to Barry and the hooded figure (later revealed to be a cursed immortal Pandora), the mentioned threat intervened and removed 10 years of history from DC characters, which created instead a brand new DC Universe. Barry then wakes up in a similar manner to the beginning of Flashpoint, also retaining all his memories from the alternate timeline. Believing that everything is over, Barry remembers Thomas' letter and gives it to Bruce, who is still Batman in this timeline. Bruce, deeply touched by his father's sacrifice to ensure his son's life, cries and expresses his gratitude to Barry for informing him of the events that transpired before the timeline was reset.

Publication

Titles 

 Prelude
 The Flash (vol. 3) #8–12
 Flashpoint main series Flashpoint #1–5
 Crossover Booster Gold (vol. 2) #44–47
 Mini-series: Several tie-in mini-series were announced via DC's "The Source" Blog and the creative teams were announced in March 2011.
 Batman-centric: Whatever Happened to Gotham City?
 Flashpoint: Batman Knight of Vengeance #1–3, written by Brian Azzarello and drawn by Eduardo Risso.
 Flashpoint: Deadman and the Flying Graysons #1–3, written by JT Krul and drawn by Mike Janin with covers by Cliff Chiang.
 Villains: Whatever Happened to the World's Greatest Super Villains?
 Flashpoint: Citizen Cold #1–3, written and drawn by Scott Kolins.
 Flashpoint: Deathstroke & the Curse of the Ravager #1–3, written by Jimmy Palmiotti and drawn by Joe Bennett & John Dell.
 Flashpoint: The Legion of Doom #1–3 written by Adam Glass and drawn by Rodeny Buchemi & Jose Marzan with cover by Miguel Sepulveda.
 Flashpoint: The Outsider #1–3, written by James Robinson and drawn by Javi Fernandez with cover by Kevin Nowlan
 Green Lantern/Superman: Whatever Happened to the Aliens?
 Flashpoint: Abin Sur – The Green Lantern #1–3, written by Adam Schlagman and drawn by Felipe Massafera.
 Flashpoint: Project: Superman #1–3, written by Scott Snyder & Lowell Francis and drawn by Gene Ha.
 Mystic-centric: Whatever Happened to Science & Magic?
 Flashpoint: Frankenstein & the Creatures of the Unknown #1–3, written by Jeff Lemire and drawn by Ibraim Roberson with covers by Doug Mahnke.
 Flashpoint: Secret Seven #1–3, written by Peter Milligan and drawn by George Pérez and Scott Koblish
 Whatever Happened to Europe?
 Flashpoint: Emperor Aquaman #1–3, written by Tony Bedard and drawn by Ardian Syaf & Vicente Cifuentes.
 Flashpoint: Wonder Woman and the Furies #1–3, written by Dan Abnett & Andy Lanning and drawn by Scott Clark & David Beaty with covers by Ed Benes.
 Flashpoint: Lois Lane and the Resistance #1–3, written by Dan Abnett & Andy Lanning and drawn by Eddy Nunez & Sandra Hope.
 Everything You Know Will Change in a Flash
 Flashpoint: Kid Flash Lost #1–3, written by Sterling Gates and drawn by Oliver Nome with covers by Francis Manapul.
 Flashpoint: The World of Flashpoint #1–3, written by Rex Ogle and drawn by Paulo Siqueira with covers by Shane Davis and Brett Booth.
 He Never Got the Ring
 Flashpoint: Hal Jordan #1–3, written by Adam Schlagman and drawn by Ben Oliver with covers by Rags Morales.
 One-shots
 Flashpoint: Grodd of War #1, written by Sean Ryan and drawn by Ug Guara with cover by Francis Manapul
 Flashpoint: Reverse-Flash #1, written by Scott Kolins and drawn by Joel Gomez with cover by Ardian Syaf and Vicente Cifuentes
 Flashpoint: Green Arrow Industries #1, written by Pornsak Pichetshote and drawn by Mark Castiello with cover by Viktor Kalvachev
 Flashpoint: The Canterbury Cricket #1, written by Mike Carlin and drawn by Rags Morales with cover by Rags Morales

Collected editions 
The series is collected into a number of volumes:

In other media

Television 
Several allusions to Flashpoint are made in The CW's live-action Arrowverse:
 Multiple allusions are made on The Flash television series during the first three seasons. The character Blackout appears in the season one episode "Power Outage". In the episode "Rogue Time", Barry Allen is warned that going back in time to save Nora Allen's life would have a terrible ripple effect on the timeline. In season one's finale "Fast Enough", Barry time travels back to the night of his mother's murder, but is told by his future self not to interfere in the events, and shares a conversation with his dying mother that is similar to the one in the comic. In the season two episode "Enter Zoom", it is revealed that Robert Queen is the vigilante known as the Arrow of Earth-2 instead of Oliver Queen, mirroring Batman's reversal in the comic. In the episode "Rupture", Harry Wells attempts to recreate the accident behind Barry's powers on the de-powered speedster using a method similar to the one featured in the comic. A loose adaptation of Flashpoint begins in season two's finale "The Race of His Life". Grief-stricken after Hunter Zolomon/Zoom kills Henry Allen, Barry travels back to 2000 and stops Eobard Thawne/Reverse-Flash from killing Nora, thus radically altering the timeline. In season three's premiere "Flashpoint", Barry has Eobard kept imprisoned in a carbine cell and lives in the new timeline (dubbed 'Flashpoint' by Eobard) for three months with both his parents alive and begins dating Iris West, while Wally West is the Flash. On the other side, Barry discovers that Joe West is a reclusive alcoholic frequently missing shifts at work, Cisco Ramon is a self-centered billionaire tech genius with no interest in helping anyone, and Caitlin Snow is not a biologist but a pediatric ophthalmologist. As in the comic book story, Barry begins losing his memories as the Flashpoint timeline starts to overwrite the timeline he is familiar with. Eobard tries to convince Barry to release him, so they can fix what he did, but Barry refuses to listen and tries to make things better by helping Wally stop The Rival. Barry succeeds in stopping the Rival who is killed by Joe, but not before Wally is critically wounded. Realizing Flashpoint's effects are only going to get worse, Barry releases Eobard who kills Nora in 2000 and returns Barry to the corrected 2016, but Eobard leaves a taunting hint that things are not exactly the same, evident by Eobard being alive in 2016 rather than being erased from existence in 2015 due to Eddie Thawne's suicide. In the episode "Paradox", several differences from the original timeline are revealed. Cisco is angry with Barry after Dante Ramon's death in a car accident and Barry refused to go back in time to prevent this. Iris and Joe have a strained relationship after Iris discovered that Joe concealed that Francine West was still alive. John Diggle has a son, John Jr., rather than a daughter, Sara. Julian Albert is a colleague in the forensics department who has been apparently working with for a year. Caitlin has been developing metahuman ice powers. Barry attempts to go back and reset the timeline again, but is pulled out the time stream by Jay Garrick. Acting as a stern mentor, Jay explains time travel consequences by comparing the timeline to a broken coffee cup – it will never be completely the same even after it has been repaired. Jay advises that Barry must live with the mistakes of Flashpoint and move forward. When Barry reveals the timeline changes, the others gradually forgive and help battle enemies from Flashpoint timeline due to Doctor Alchemy.
 The episode "Armageddon, Part 4" revealed that Eobard Thawne created a Reverse-Flashpoint where he was Flash and Barry was Reverse-Flash after Thawne went back in time to kill Nora and a younger Barry. In this timeline, Reverse-Flash assisted Damien Darhk in killing Ray Palmer, Nate Heywood, Sara Lance, most of the Legends, and Cisco Ramon, Joe West was knocked onto the train tracks in front of a moving train by Reverse-Flash, Ryan Choi became the new Atom, Frost and Mark Blaine are dating, Allegra Garcia and Chester P. Runk used to date which didn't work out and noted after a devastating fight with the Legion of Doom, Damien's daughter Nora Darhk has died at some point, and Ryan Wilder and Sophie Moore are married where they plan to adopt a child. Investigating what Despero meant that he would cause Armageddon, Flash goes to the year 2031 where he learns of the changes and his role in the Reverse-Flashpoint where Barry will fade away when the Reverse-Flashpoint becomes permanent by midnight. With help from the Reverse-Flashpoint Darhk, Barry had to run at the speeds to undo the Reverse-Flashpoint with Thawne right behind him. While Darhk coordinated him while fighting Frost, Chillblaine, Atom, and Sentinel, Barry was able to undo the Reverse-Flashpoint.
 The Flashpoint timeline's fallout continued in season two of Legends of Tomorrow. A temporal clone of Eobard Thawne works with Damien Darhk, Malcolm Merlyn and Leonard Snart to change their histories by acquiring the Spear of Destiny to rewrite reality and avert their respective demises/deaths and Eobard's erasure from history. This eventually ends with Eobard getting caught by the Black Flash and being wiped from existence again.
 This version of Eobard also made brief returns in season seven of Legends of Tomorrow and season eight of The Flash.

Film 
 The 2013 DC Universe Animated Original Movie entitled Justice League: The Flashpoint Paradox closely adapts the Flashpoint comic's story. Similar to the comic launching The New 52, the film served to launch a shared universe of fifteen DC animated films released between 2013 and 2020. Among the differences is the prologue with the Justice League helping the Flash defeat the Rogues, the implication that Eobard Thawne is not Nora Allen's killer, Enchantress not betraying Cyborg's Resistance, and Lex Luthor being a part of Deathstroke's crew of pirates.
 In Justice League Dark: Apokolips War, John Constantine reads Flash's mind to learn about the "Flashpoint" incident. Following the defeat of Darkseid and Batman stating that Earth lost 31% of its molten core, Constantine asks Flash to travel back in time to trigger another Flashpoint and restart the timeline over again so that the current state of things will be erased. Barry replies that he promised his wife Iris not to do it again. Constantine assures him that, though certain changes will not be good, it will still be much better than their bleak predicament. Flash resolves to follow through and runs off into the Speed Force, and the surviving Justice League watch as a white dome of light resets reality.
 Elements of the Flashpoint  storyline are planned to be incorporated for the DC Extended Universe film The Flash. The film is to be directed by Andy Muschietti, from a screenplay by Christina Hodson, with Ezra Miller reprising the role of The Flash and Ben Affleck and Michael Keaton reprising their respective roles of Batman, with the film also set to debut the DC Cinematic Multiverse. The film is scheduled to be released in theaters on June 16, 2023.

Video games 
 The 2013 video game Injustice: Gods Among Us had Flashpoint-inspired designs of Batman, Aquaman, Wonder Woman and Deathstroke as downloadable content.
 The 2015 video game Batman: Arkham Knight had Batman's Flashpoint design for Batman as downloadable content.
 The 2017 video game Injustice 2 featured the Flashpoint version of Wonder Woman making a cameo in Green Arrow's alternate ending as a member of the multiverse Justice League.
 The 2011 video game DC Universe Online launched its 40th episode, "World of Flashpoint" in 2021, featuring Queen Wonder Woman, Emperor Aquaman, Batman (Thomas Wayne), and the Flash.

References

External links 
  at DC Comics.com

Apocalyptic comics
Flash (comics)
Comics about time travel
Crossover comics
Comics by Geoff Johns
Reboot comics
Comics about multiple time paths
Dystopian comics
Comic book reboots
DC Comics adapted into films